Pablo Barahona (born 10 April 1970) is a Honduran swimmer. He competed in four events at the 1988 Summer Olympics.

References

1970 births
Living people
Honduran male swimmers
Olympic swimmers of Honduras
Swimmers at the 1988 Summer Olympics
Place of birth missing (living people)
20th-century Honduran people